Cape Dory Yachts was a Massachusetts-based builder of fiberglass sailboats, powerboats, and pleasure trawlers which operated from 1963 to 1992.  It also produced a small number of commercial craft.

History 
The company was founded in 1963 by Andrew Vavolotis in Bridgewater, Massachusetts. It began building a small fiberglass sailing dinghy, the Cape Dory 10.  Later it moved to a facility in Taunton, Massachusetts, producing thousands of boats during the company's lifespan.  After the dingy it introduced the popular Typhoon series of small sailboats, then cruising yachts ranging from 22 to 45 feet.

Carl Alberg designed many of the company's models, favoring simple lines, narrow beams, and often utilizing a full keel for superior handling in heavier winds and seas.  Together they gave these boats the classic Cape Dory look.  Alberg utilized the aforementioned full keel with attached rudder for a sleek and sturdy shape.

In later years the company added pleasure powerboats and trawlers and some commercial boats to its output.

The Cape Dory 25D has been single-handed across both the Atlantic (New York to Ireland) and Pacific (California to Australia) oceans and a solo circumnavigation was completed in a Cape Dory 28.

A division was Intrepid Yachts, which built the Intrepid 28 starting in 1979, among other designs.

When Cape Dory folded in 1992 it sold a number of its designs to New York's Newport Shipyards, which ceased operations in 1996.  The hull molds and designs for several models were then acquired by Robinhood Marine.  Headed by Cape Dory founder Vavolotis, it makes them available today as semi-custom yachts.

Models

See also
List of sailboat designers and manufacturers

Notes

References

External links 
 Article on the Cape Dory 25 sailboat at sailboat.guide
 Article on the Cape Dory 28 sailboat at sailboat.guide
 Article on the Cape Dory 36 sailboat at sailboat.guide

Cape Dory Yachts